The Palm Islands consist of three artificial islands, Palm Jumeirah, Deira Island, and Palm Jebel Ali, on the coast of Dubai, United Arab Emirates. The Palm Islands were constructed around the same time as The World Islands. Nakheel Properties is the real estate developer of the Palm Islands. The creation of the islands began in 2001 and ended around 2006/2007. These islands have significantly impacted ocean sediment and wildlife in the surrounding area.

Islands

Palm Jumeirah is the site of numerous private residences and hotels. From the air, the archipelago resembles a stylized palm tree within a circle. Construction began in 2001 and was financed mainly by Dubai's income from petroleum. By 2009, 28 hotels had opened on the site. The Atlantis is the largest hotel currently constructed on Palm Jumeirah. The island has a population of over 18,000 people as of 2015. 

Palm Jebel Ali is an artificial archipelago that features a palm tree that is 50% larger than the original Palm Jumeirah. The island has a larger crescent shape. Space has been created between the crescent and the tree to build boardwalks that encircle the "fronds" of the "palm" and spell out an Arabic poem written by Sheikh Mohammed bin Rashid Al Maktoum. Construction on the island began in 2001, but as of 2018, progression has been halted due to the financial crisis of 2007-2008.

The Deira Islands are four undeveloped artificial islands off the coast of Deira, Dubai, United Arab Emirates. As of 2021, little development has taken place on the islands due to the financial crisis of 2007–2008. At first, the project—which was supposed to be a part of the Palm Islands—was known as Palm Deira. It was intended to be the biggest palm of the three, roughly eight times as big as the Palm Jumeirah.

Purpose 
Dubai built the Palm Tree Islands to increase the coastline for tourists. Dubai is known for its sunny weather and beaches, but more than 72 km (45 miles) of coastline was needed to accommodate the goal of tripling the number of tourists to 15 million annually. The solution was to construct a massive island shaped like a palm tree, which, upon completion in 2006, would add 56 km (35 miles) to the coastline. The island is designed to be a city within itself, featuring shopping centers, restaurants, hotels, and residential properties.

Environmental concerns
The construction of the Palm Islands has had a significant impact on the surrounding environment, resulting in changes to area wildlife, coastal erosion, alongshore sediment transport, and wave patterns. Sediment stirred up by construction has suffocated and injured local marine fauna and reduced the amount of sunlight that filters down to seashore vegetation. Variations in alongshore sediment transport have resulted in changes in erosion patterns along the UAE coast, which has also been exacerbated by altered wave patterns as the waters of the Persian Gulf attempt to move around the new obstruction of the islands. According to a study published in the journal Water in 2022, the construction of Palm Jumeirah Island has increased water-soluble materials, changed the water's spectral profile, and increased the water surface temperature around the island.

Greenpeace has criticized the Palm Islands for the lack of sustainability, and non-profit environmental news service Mongabay has reported on Dubai's artificial islands, stating that:

Significant changes in the maritime environment [of Dubai] [... ] As a result of the dredging and redepositing of sand for the construction of the islands, the typically crystalline waters of the Persian Gulf at Dubai have become severely clouded with silt. Construction activity is damaging the marine habitat, burying coral reefs, oyster beds and subterranean fields of seagrass, threatening local marine species and other species dependent on them for food. Oyster beds have been covered in as much as two inches of sediment, while above the water, beaches are eroding with the disruption of natural currents.

Structural importance
Palm Jumeirah was built entirely from sand and rocks; no concrete or steel was used to build the island. This was done in accordance with the order of the Ruler of Dubai, who came up with the idea for Palm Islands and the design.

Construction resources involved
5.5 million cubic meters of rock were brought from over 16 quarries in Dubai.
94 million cubic meters of sand brought from deep sea beds 6 nautical miles from the coast of Dubai.
700 tons of limestone

Project risks and threats
Sinking
Waves two meters high
Annual or biennial storm frequency
Weak soil due to constant exposure to the rising sea water
Water pollution

Hidden problems
Erosion caused by wind and water currents is one of the biggest problems, as erosion is stripping away the sand that forms most of the island.
Damage to the marine ecology (for example, the loss of reefs and fish), including disturbances in the reproductive cycles of the species of fish that were close to the shores of Dubai. Research conducted by marine biologists on this phenomenon showed that the newly born fish could not survive in conditions along the shores of Dubai due to constant construction and environmental alterations (for example, shifting of sand, moving boulders, and the effects of the vibrations).
There is a loss of coastal shape along the seashore of Dubai.

Obstacles after the island construction
Installation of utilities and pipelines was very difficult and required a lot of labour.

Risk mitigation
To counteract the waves and constant motion of the sea, breakwaters were built around the island. They are 3 meters high and 160 km in total length. Expanded over a length of about 11.5 km, the base of these breakwaters and the island itself were constantly monitored during the construction process with the help of deep-sea divers. The divers checked the alignment and placement of the rocks beneath the surface to ensure their stability. The shape of the island was monitored using the global positioning system.

The sand on top of the island was sprayed by a technique called rain-bowing. The whole island was planned to have no stagnant water between the island and the breakwaters. To achieve this, small structural modifications were made to the breakwaters surrounding the island, allowing the seawater to move through the breakers without causing any damage to the island. To prevent erosion of the sand from the island, maintenance systems spray material along the coast of the island and also along the coast of Dubai. 

Coastal ecology was recovered with the help of nature itself. These changes began attracting newer species of fish and also reef formations. Every 6 weeks, sea divers go underwater to check the marine life as part of their monitoring process. Precautions were also taken to prevent liquefaction of the sand on the island (below the upper surface). Liquefaction is caused by the movement of the rocks, sand, and the underwater erosion before and after construction. A vibro-compaction technique was used to prevent the process of liquefaction. This was done in order to hold the island's base together and to make a strong foundation for further construction.

Construction effects and repercussions
The construction of the Palm islands along the coast of Dubai has caused several significant environmental changes:

 A reduction in the area's aquatic life
 Erosion of the coastal soil  
 Irregular sediment transport along the shore 

There is also a dramatic change in wave patterns along the coast of Dubai due to the rock walls constructed around the palm islands. Instead of hitting the shores directly, the waves move unusually around the new obstruction. This has led to the weakening of the shores of Dubai.

The origin of most of the environmental damage stems from disturbed sediment from construction of the Palm islands. The sediment decreased the amount of sunlight filtering down to the sea vegetation and injured the surrounding marine fauna. Environmental disturbances caused by changes in sediment and coastal erosion have attracted the attention of environmental groups such as Greenpeace.

In 2006, the World Wildlife Fund announced, "[The] UAE's human pressure on global ecosystems (its ecological footprint) [is] the highest in the world. The country is supposedly at present five times more unsustainable than any other country" (Samarai, 2007). It also mentioned that the construction from the start up to date had caused many visible ecological and environmental changes that threatened the future.

Remedial Measure to Protect the Coast 
To properly manage their shorelines and effects, Dubai relies on its coastal monitoring program. Established in 1997, the Dubai coastal monitoring program began studying the baseline bathymetric (measurement of the depth of water in oceans or seas) and topographic survey of the Jumeirah (Dubai) coastline.

Additional data was collected with technological improvements, including remote video monitoring of Dubai beaches, sediment sampling and analysis, near-shore directional wave and current recordings, and intensive measurement exercises at selected locations using Acoustic Doppler Current Profiler (ADCP) equipment. Because of this, they can constantly monitor the continuously changing environmental conditions along the coast of Dubai.

See also
The World, another artificial island project in Dubai
Tourism in Dubai
Ocean colonization
Tourist attractions in Dubai

References

External links

The Palm Islands official website
Gallery of The Palm Islands
Timelapse animation of The Palm Islands construction
The Palm Islands - slideshow by The First Post

Nakheel Properties
Resorts in Dubai
Archipelagoes of the United Arab Emirates